Testament is a 1983 drama film based on a three-page story titled "The Last Testament" by Carol Amen (1933–1987), directed by Lynne Littman and written by John Sacret Young. The film tells the story of how one small suburban town near the San Francisco Bay Area slowly falls apart after a nuclear war destroys outside civilization. It was one of the films, along with the television miniseries The Day After, that portrayed life after a nuclear war, mostly in response to an increase in hostility between the United States and the Soviet Union.

Originally produced for the PBS series American Playhouse, it was given a theatrical release instead by Paramount Pictures (although PBS did subsequently air it a year later). The cast includes Jane Alexander, William Devane, Leon Ames, Ross Harris, Lukas Haas, Roxana Zal and, in small roles shortly before their rise to stardom, Kevin Costner and Rebecca De Mornay. Alexander was nominated for an Oscar for Best Actress for her performance.

Plot
The Wetherly family — husband Tom, wife Carol, and children Brad, Mary Liz, and Scottie — live in the fictional suburb of Hamelin, California. Tom, the breadwinner, works nearby in San Francisco.

On a routine afternoon, Carol listens to an answering-machine message from Tom saying he is on his way home for dinner. Scottie watches Sesame Street on TV when the show is suddenly replaced by white noise; a San Francisco news anchor appears onscreen, saying they have lost their New York signal and there were explosions of "nuclear devices up and down the East Coast." The anchorman is cut off by the Emergency Broadcast System tone. An announcer's voice states that the White House is interrupting the program, but the blinding flash of a nuclear detonation is seen through the window and the broadcast goes dead. The family huddles on the floor in panic as the town's air-raid sirens go off; minutes later, several of their neighbors are seen running around on the street outside, dazed in fear and confusion. The family tries to remain calm, hoping Tom is safe.

The suburb of Hamelin seems to survive relatively unscathed. Frightened residents meet at the home of Henry Abhart, an elderly ham radio operator. He has made contact with survivors in rural areas and internationally, but reveals that the entire Bay Area and all major U.S. cities are radio-silent. Larry, a local boy who lost his parents, moves in with the Wetherleys but succumbs to radiation poisoning. The school play about the Pied Piper of Hamelin was in rehearsal before the bombings; desperate to recapture some normality, the town decides to go on with the show. The parents smile and applaud, many of them in tears. The day after the attack, the children notice contaminated fallout dirt settling on solid surfaces as a result of the blast. Residents now have to cope with losing municipal services, food and gas shortages and, ultimately, the loss of loved ones to radiation poisoning. Scottie, the first to succumb, is buried in the backyard. As the dead accumulate faster than the manpower to bury them, wooden caskets are used as fuel for funeral pyres later, and Carol sews together a burial shroud from bedsheets for her daughter, Mary Liz, who also dies from radiation exposure.

While the young die, older residents fall to rapid dementia, and order in the town starts to break down as police and firefighter ranks dwindle. A young couple leave town after losing their infant, hoping to find safety and solace elsewhere. Carol's search for a battery causes her to listen once more to her husband's final message on the answering machine. To her sorrow, she finds a later (and previously unheard) message on the machine from Tom: he decided to stay at work late in San Francisco on the day of the attack, and she gives up hope that he will return home. Brad, Carol's last surviving child, helps his mother and takes over the radio for Henry Abhart. They adopt a mentally-disabled boy named Hiroshi who Tom used to take fishing along with his children, after Hiroshi's father dies. Soon thereafter Carol starts showing signs of radiation poisoning. Carol decides she, Brad and Hiroshi should avoid a slow and painful death from radiation poisoning and instead take their own lives via carbon monoxide poisoning. They gather in the family's station wagon with the engine running and the garage door closed, but Carol cannot bring herself to go through with the deed. They are finally seen sitting by candlelight to celebrate Brad's birthday, using a graham cracker in place of a cake. When asked what they should wish for, Carol answers: "That we remember it all...the good and the awful." She blows out the candle. An old family home movie of a surprise birthday party for Tom plays, showing him as he blows out the candles on his cake.

Cast
 Jane Alexander as Carol Wetherly
 William Devane as Tom Wetherly 
 Ross Harris as Brad Wetherly
 Roxana Zal as Mary Liz Wetherly
 Lukas Haas as Scottie Wetherly
 Philip Anglim as Hollis
 Lilia Skala as Fania
 Leon Ames as Henry Abhart
 Lurene Tuttle as Rosemary Abhart
 Rebecca De Mornay as Cathy Pitkin
 Kevin Costner as Phil Pitkin
 Mako as Mike

Background

Testament was based upon a three-page short story written by Carol Amen, an American writing teacher who had the story published in the August 1981 issue of Ms. Magazine. Kyle Raymond Fitzpatrick of Los Angeles Review of Books traced Amen's story to a number of other 1980s periodical publications, stating, "The appearance of Amen’s “The Last Testament” in [Ms. Magazine] was actually a reprint: the story originally ran in the September 1980 issue of the St. Anthony Messenger, an Ohio-based religious magazine published by the Franciscan Friars, with a circulation of roughly 350,000 in the 1980s. The story was written 14 years prior to the movie’s release, according to a feature on Amen that appeared in The San Francisco Examiner in October 1983."  

Amen died from cancer in 1987; according to an article in The Los Angeles Times released one week before her death, "Mrs. Amen taught writing at area adult schools and colleges. She wrote a three-page story she called “Last Testament” that appeared in print in 1981. It described a family in a small Northern California town and how it coped in the aftermath of a nuclear explosion."

Production
Testament was shot entirely on location in the town of Sierra Madre, California, a suburb community of Los Angeles located in the San Gabriel Valley.

Reception

Initial

Testament received positive reviews from the few critics who got the opportunity to see it. On Rotten Tomatoes, the film has an approval rating of 89% based on reviews from 45 critics.

Roger Ebert of the Chicago Sun-Times gave the film a rare four stars out of four, and was highly enthusiastic about the film. Ebert wrote that the film was powerful and made him cry, even after the second time he watched it. Ebert wrote: "The film is about a suburban American family, and what happens to that family after a nuclear war. It is not a science-fiction movie, and it doesn't have any special effects, and there are no big scenes of buildings blowing over or people disintegrating. We never even see a mushroom cloud. We never even know who started the war. Instead, Testament is a tragedy about manners: It asks how we might act toward one another, how our values might stand up, in the face of an overwhelming catastrophe."

Christopher John reviewed Testament in Ares Magazine Special Edition #2 and commented that "Testament may not change any lives, but it is bound to change the way some people think. Considering the subject matter, every little bit will help."

Testament was nominated for one Academy Award, a Best Actress nomination for Jane Alexander.

Retrospective
Testament has had positive retrospective reviews. Screen Rant has listed the film as one of the best science fiction movies directed by a woman, noting that it "went on to inspire other speculative war disaster media such as the TV show Jericho." Jacqueline Foertsch wrote that, in contrast to "a sizable majority of postapocalyptic and science fiction texts authored by Western male authors," Testament does not "ignore the reality of nuclear catastrophe" and "emphasize[s] threats to the well-being of families." Tor.com, in a piece on dystopian science fiction, called Testament "a realistic vision of the world we might live in after the bombs drop" and "quiet, brilliant little movie." Film critic Alexandra Heller-Nicholas wrote that Testament "utilises sci-fi to communicate a political message and remains a fascinating vision of life after a nuclear war" and "it remains a powerful but often widely forgotten sci-fi treasure." The Encyclopedia of Science Fiction calls it "potent and sentimental" and notes that it "seems not interested in causes, only in effects – in marked contrast to The Day After, made the same year."

The Science Fiction Handbook contrasts the film and others from the decade against 1950s,1960s dystopian films such as On the Beach, World Without End and Panic in the Year Zero. by stating how "other post-holocaust films of the long 1950s were even more indirect in their representation of nuclear war and its aftermath: graphic on-screen depictions of the actual effects of nuclear war were rare until the mid-1980s,
when a spate of such films appeared, including The Day After (1983), Testament (1983), and Threads (1985)."

Home media
Testament was released by Paramount Home Video on Beta, VHS videocassette, Laserdisc and RCA's CED System in 1984.

The film was released on DVD in 2004 in an edition that contained three featurettes: Testament at 20, Testament: Nuclear Thoughts, and Timeline of the Nuclear Age; this edition has gone out of print.

As part of its 2013 agreement with Paramount Pictures, Warner Home Video made the film available in 2014 for purchase on MOD (Manufactured on Demand) DVD Recordable disc via its Warner Archive Collection.

The Australian specialty home video reissue studio  Imprint Films  released the film on Blu-ray disc in late 2022 in an edition limited to 1500 copies.

See also
 The Day After, television film aired 2 weeks after Testament was released
 Threads, 1984 British television film
 List of apocalyptic and post-apocalyptic fiction
 List of nuclear holocaust fiction

References

External links
 
 

1983 films
1980s disaster films
1983 drama films
Anti-nuclear films
American disaster films
American science fiction drama films
Films about nuclear war and weapons
Films based on short fiction
Films set in the San Francisco Bay Area
Down syndrome in film
Paramount Pictures films
American post-apocalyptic films
Films about World War III
Films scored by James Horner
1980s science fiction drama films
1980s English-language films
1980s American films